Phantasies and Senseitions is the debut studio album of Bügsküll, released in 1994 by Road Cone.

Critical reception
A critic for Alternative Press compared the band favorably to The Residents, Sun Ra, The Orb, Eggs and early Sebadoh, saying the music "has the refreshing splendor of naive folk art, that sense of being timeless and utterly natural." He lauded the band for their sense of adventure and concluded that "Bugskull breathe ingenuity like the rest of us breathe oxygen." In a mixed review, Dean Suzuki of the music journal Option described the album as "a skittish and disorienting spectrum of different musical genres" and likened it to "listening to the soundtrack of a hyperactive and artily pretentious foreign film." He concluded by saying that although the band was talented that they needed to tighten their sound

Track listing

Personnel 
Adapted from the Phantasies and Senseitions liner notes.

Bügsküll
Brendan Bell – bass guitar, keyboards, saxophone, clarinet, production, engineering, mixing
Sean Byrne – lead vocals, guitar, keyboards, clarinet, percussion, production, engineering, cover art
James Yu – drums, violin, design

Production and additional personnel
Aaron Day – guitar (6), drums and clarinet (10)
Suzie Ziegler – bass guitar (11)

Release history

References

External links 
 

1994 debut albums
Bugskull albums